Muzakir Manaf (born 3 April 1964), popularly known as Mualem, is an Indonesian politician and former Free Aceh Movement (GAM) guerilla fighter who served as the vice governor of Aceh between 2012 and 2017. Leading the movement's guerilla wing following the death of his predecessor, he was its leader at the end of the conflict and later founded the Aceh Party, becoming its first and current chairman.

Career

GAM
Manaf stated that when he graduated from high school, he signed up to join the Indonesian National Armed Forces, but failed and instead went to Malaysia to sign up as a GAM fighter, this time passing. In 1986, Manaf left for Libya, where he received combat training with other GAM members.

Following the death of GAM commander Abdullah Syafi'i in 2002 during combat with Indonesian Army soldiers, Muzakir Manaf became the commander of GAM's central command.

Following the Helsinki agreement, Manaf went out of hiding and entered public view for the first time, and began serving as the chairman of the Aceh Transition Committee. Later on, he was one of the co-founders of the Self-Sufficient Aceh Movement Party ( or Partai GAM, later renamed to just Aceh Party following complaints from the central government) and became its first chairman.

Provincial government
In Aceh's 2012 gubernatorial election, Manaf ran as the running mate of fellow GAM member Zaini Abdullah and the pair won the election, with Manaf being sworn in as Vice Governor on 4 June 2012. Manaf was still popular with former GAM combatants even after his election. In one occasion, militant leader Din Minimi, who led an armed group in East Aceh, refused to be brought to Jakarta or Banda Aceh unless Manaf was to meet him first.

He ran again in the 2017 gubernatorial election, this time as a gubernatorial candidate. However, he was defeated by former governor Irwandi Yusuf. Initially, though, Manaf's campaign team also claimed victory and refused to accept the results.

References

1964 births
Living people
Politicians from Aceh
Free Aceh Movement members
Vice Governors of Indonesian provinces